Ikhsan Hidayah Marzuki (born 31 May 2000) is an Indonesian professional footballer who plays as a defender for KS Inter Banten.

Club career

Persikabo 1973
He was signed for Persikabo 1973 to play in Liga 1 in the 2021 season. Marzuki made his professional debut on 9 December 2021 in a match against Persiraja Banda Aceh at the Sultan Agung Stadium, Bantul.

International career
In November 2019, Ikhsan was named as Indonesia U-20 All Stars squad, to play in U-20 International Cup held in Bali.

Career statistics

Club

Notes

References

External links
 Ikhsan Marzuki at Soccerway
 Ikhsan Marzuki at Liga Indonesia

2000 births
Living people
Indonesian footballers
Persikabo 1973 players
Association football defenders
People from Bekasi
Sportspeople from West Java